Haywire is a collaborative mixtape by  American rappers Hopsin and  SwizZz. The project was the debut release by independent hip hop record label Funk Volume. It was released on July 18, 2009 on DatPiff. In addition, a physical release of the project debuted as well onto iTunes on May 8, 2012. The mixtape spawned three singles, "Lucifer Effect", "Bad Motherfucker" and "Leave Me Alone". As of 2016, the project has been downloaded over 500,000 times. Physical copies of the mixtape are now unavailable for purchase and out of print due to the label Funk Volume now defunct as the physical copy had to be purchased through the Funk Volume website which is currently unavailable.

Track listing
All songs produced by Marcus Hopson

References

2009 mixtape albums
Hopsin albums
Funk Volume albums